Istiqlal means independence and may refer to:

Political parties
Azərbaycan Milli İstiqlal Partiyası or Azerbaijan National Independence Party, political party in Azerbaijan
Harakat Al-Istiqlal or Independence Movement (Lebanon), political party in Lebanon
Haras al Istiqlal or Guardians of Independence, Iraqi political party under the British Mandate of Mesopotamia
Hizb al-Istiqlal or Independence Party (Palestine), Arab political party under the British Mandate of Palestine
Istiqlal Party, the Hizb al-istiqlāl or Independence Party, political party in Morocco
Jammu Kashmir Mahaz e Istiqlal (JKMI), Kashmiri Revolutionary Political Freedom Fighter organization
Tehrik-e-Istiqlal or Independence Movement, political party in Pakistan

Other uses
Istiglal Anti-Material Rifle, Azerbaijani gun
İstiklal Avenue in Istanbul, Turkey
Istiqlal Mosque, Jakarta, or Masjid Istiqlal, or Independence Mosque, National mosque of Indonesia
Istiqlal Mosque, Sarajevo in Bosnia and Herzegovina
Istiqlal Mosque in Haifa, Israel
Istiglal Ordeni, the Independence Order, Azerbaijani honour
Istiqlál, the name of the last day of the week in the Bahá'í calendar, corresponding to Friday
Istiqlal, a Uyghur exile-operated media organization based in Turkey
Istiglaliyyat Street in Baku, Azerbaijan
Yom-e-Istiqlal, or Independence Day (Pakistan)

See also
Esteghlal (disambiguation)